In poetry, enjambment ( or ; from the French enjamber) is incomplete syntax at the end of a line; the meaning 'runs over' or 'steps over' from one poetic line to the next, without punctuation. Lines without enjambment are end-stopped. The origin of the word is credited to the French word enjamber, which means 'to straddle or encroach'.

In reading, the delay of meaning creates a tension that is released when the word or phrase that completes the syntax is encountered (called the rejet); the tension arises from the "mixed message" produced both by the pause of the line-end, and the suggestion to continue provided by the incomplete meaning. In spite of the apparent contradiction between rhyme, which heightens closure, and enjambment, which delays it, the technique is compatible with rhymed verse. Even in couplets, the closed or heroic couplet was a late development; older is the open couplet, where rhyme and enjambed lines co-exist.

Enjambment has a long history in poetry. Homer used the technique, and it is the norm for alliterative verse where rhyme is unknown. In the 32nd Psalm of the Hebrew Bible enjambment is unusually conspicuous. It was used extensively in England by Elizabethan poets for dramatic and narrative verses, before giving way to closed couplets. The example of John Milton in Paradise Lost laid the foundation for its subsequent use by the English Romantic poets; in its preface he identified it as one of the chief features of his verse: "sense variously drawn out from one verse into another".

Examples 
The start of The Waste Land by T. S. Eliot, with only lines 4 and 7 end-stopped:

These lines from Shakespeare's The Winter's Tale (c. 1611) are heavily enjambed (meaning enjambment is used):

Meaning flows as the lines progress, and the reader's eye is forced to go on to the next sentence. It can also make the reader feel uncomfortable or the poem feel like "flow-of-thought" with a sensation of urgency or disorder.  In contrast, the following lines from Romeo and Juliet (c. 1595) are completely end-stopped:

Each line is formally correspondent with a unit of thought—in this case, a clause of a sentence. End-stopping is more frequent in early Shakespeare: as his style developed, the proportion of enjambment in his plays increased. Scholars such as Goswin König and A. C. Bradley have estimated approximate dates of undated works of Shakespeare by studying the frequency of enjambment.

Endymion by John Keats, lines 2–4:

The song "One Night In Bangkok", from the musical Chess, written by Tim Rice and Björn Ulvaeus, includes examples such as :

Closely related to enjambment is the technique of "broken rhyme" or "split rhyme" which involves the splitting of an individual word, typically to allow a rhyme with one or more syllables of the split word.  In English verse, broken rhyme is used almost exclusively in light verse, such as to form a word that rhymes with "orange", as in this example by Willard Espy, in his poem "The Unrhymable Word: Orange":

The clapping game "Miss Susie" uses the break "... Hell / -o operator" to allude to the taboo word "Hell", then replaces it with the innocuous "Hello".

See also

 Blank verse
 Caesura
 Concrete poetry
 Free verse
 Line break (poetry)

Notes

References

Further reading
John Hollander, Vision and Resonance, Oxford U. Press, 1975 (especially chapter 5).
 Free online explanation with examples

Poetic devices
Poetic rhythm